
William Sanborn Ballinger (1912-1980) was an American writer and screenwriter.

Early life
He was born 13 March 1912 in Oskalloosa, Iowa. He received his education at the University of Wisconsin, receiving a B.A. in 1934, and earned an LL.D. from Northern College, Philippines in 1940.

Career
Working in radio and advertising in the early 1940s, Ballinger wrote 81 radio scripts and produced The Dinah Shore Show, The Breakfast Club, and Lowell Thomas broadcasts.  After Ballinger moved from New York to Los Angeles he began writing full-time.

Writing primarily under his own name, but occasionally using the pen names B.X. Sanborn and Frederic Freyer, Ballinger authored almost 30 books and twenty-five short stories.  His mysteries sold more than ten million copies in the U.S., and have been reprinted in thirty countries and translated into more than thirteen languages.  The hardboiled private-detective novel The Body in the Bed marked his debut in 1948, and he followed this with the sequel The Body Beautiful, the following year.

Best known as a writer of suspense novels, he achieved international fame as an early exponent of dual narrative storytelling, employing first and third person narration and two stories in tandem that converge to produce an unexpected ending.  His most famous work, Portrait in Smoke, published in 1950, received a Les Grands Maîtres du Roman Policier Award and was filmed in 1956 as Wicked as they Come. Subsequent split-narration novels, including the internationally bestselling The Tooth and the Nail, The Longest Second, which was nominated for an Edgar Award for Best Mystery novel in 1958, The Wife of the Red-Haired Man, and Not I, Said the Vixen, brought him further success. Ballinger's two main fictional characters in his novels were Chicago private investigator Barr Breed and Native American Central Intelligence Agency Agent Joaquin Hawke.

Between 1977 and 1979 he was an associate professor of writing at the California State University Northridge, Los Angeles, California.

Later life
Ballinger died 23 March 1980 Tarzana, California.

Screenwriting
Ballinger was a frequent writer for American television with 150 teleplays to his name.  These included seven teleplays for Alfred Hitchcock Presents (one of which, "The Day of the Bullet," based on a short story by Stanley Ellin, won him an Edgar for Best Half-Hour Teleplay in 1961), two episodes of Kolchak: The Night Stalker, several police television shows such as Tightrope and Ironside and the episode "The Mice" for The Outer Limits.

In addition to his books and teleplays, Ballinger wrote screenplays for Burt Topper's The Strangler (1963) and Operation CIA (1965), a Burt Reynolds spy film set in Vietnam but filmed in Thailand.

Barr Breed series
 The Body in the Bed (New York, Harper, 1948)
 The Body Beautiful (New York, Harper, 1949)

Joaquin Hawks series
 The Spy in the Jungle (New York, New American Library, 1965)
 The Chinese Mask (New York, New American Library, 1965)
 The Spy in Bangkok (New York, New American Library, 1965)
 The Spy at Angor Wat (New York, New American Library, 1966)
 The Spy in the Java Sea (New York, New American Library, 1966)

Non series novels

 Portrait in Smoke (New York, Harper, 1950)
 The Darkening Door (New York, Harper, 1952)
 Rafferty (New York, Harper, 1953)
 The Tooth and the Nail (New York, Harper, 1955)
 The Black Black Hearse (New York, St. Martin's Press, 1955) - as Frederic Freyer
 The Longest Second (New York, Harper, 1957) 
 The Wife of the Red-Haired Man (New York, Harper, 1957) 
 Beacon in the Night (New York, Harper, 1958)
 Formula For Murder (New York, New American Library, 1958)
 The Doom Maker (New York, Dutton, 1959) - as B.X. Sanborn.
 The Fourth Forever (New York, Harper, 1963)

 Not I Said the Vixen (New York, Fawcett, 1965)
 The Heir Hunters (New York, Harper, 1966)
 The Source of Fear (New York, New American Library, 1968) 
 The 49 Days of Death (Los Angeles, Pyramid, 1969)
 Heist Me Higher (New York, New American Library, 1969)
 The Lopsided Man (Los Angeles, Pyramid, 1969)
 The Corsican (New York, Dodd Mead, 1974)
 The Law (New York, Warner, 1975), novelisation
 The Ultimate Warrior (New York, Warner, 1975)
 Lost City of Stone (New York, Simon & Schuster, 1978)

Filmography

Films

Television

References

External links
 
 Author Bill S. Ballinger appreciation website

1912 births
1980 deaths
American instructional writers
20th-century American novelists
20th-century American male writers
American crime fiction writers
American male novelists
American male screenwriters
American television writers
American male television writers
American spy fiction writers
American thriller writers
People from Oskaloosa, Iowa
20th-century American non-fiction writers
American male non-fiction writers
Screenwriters from Iowa
20th-century American screenwriters
American expatriates in the Philippines
University of Wisconsin alumni